The 1982 World Rubik's Cube Championship was a competition for speedsolving the 3×3×3 Rubik's Cube. 

It was held in Budapest, Hungary, on 5 June 1982. Contestants selected from 19 countries took part. Minh Thai from the United States of America was the winner with a best time of 22.95 after three attempts for each contestant. The top attempt of three was taken as the competitor's score. First prize was a gold-plated Rubik's Cube.

Writing shortly afterwards, David Singmaster who was one of the judges, described the competition as being efficiently organized, although at one point power for the TV and the display timer failed in the middle of a trial. The cubes were selected by Ernő Rubik himself, and according to Singmaster "competitors described them as pretty good". However, writing around 20 years later, Jessica Fridrich who had participated in the contest, criticised the cubes for being "really hard to turn and were not prepared for serious speed cubing".

This competition was the first officially recognised competition of its kind. The next competition was held in 2003 in Canada, with many differences to the competition structure and many other puzzles being added other than the Rubik's Cube. The World Cube Association, founded in 2004, retroactively recognizes the results of the 1982 championship despite substantial differences between the event and modern speedsolving competitions.

Results 
The results were:

WR = World Record

ER = European Record

AsR = Asian Record

NAR = North American Record

SAR = South American Record

OcR = Oceanic Record

NR = National Record

 Sandqivst's second attempt was disqualified since his cube was broken twice in the same attempt. This was a violation of the competition rules and the attempt was stopped at that point.

References

Rubik's Cube
1982 in Hungarian sport
1982 in sports
International sports competitions in Budapest
International sports competitions hosted by Hungary